Brahm is both a surname and a given name of multiple origins. Notable people with the name include:

 German surname
Charles Brahm (born 1917), Belgian canoeist
Chandan Brahm, Indian politician
Dragutin Brahm, Croatian mountain climber
Ferdinand de Brahm, German-born American military engineer 
Jake Brahm, grocery store clerk and blogger
John Brahm (1893–1982), German-born American film and television director
John William Gerard de Brahm (1718 - c. 1799), German cartographer, engineer and mystic
Nikolaus Joseph Brahm (1751 – c. 1812), German zoologist
Otto Brahm, (1856-1912), German theatre manager and director
Terry Brahm (born 1962), American distance runner

Other names
Ajahn Brahm

See also 
Brahm (disambiguation)
Brahms (disambiguation)

References

German-language surnames
Jewish surnames